Avinash is a 1986 Hindi-language Indian action thriller film directed by Umesh Mehra, starring Mithun Chakraborty, Parveen Babi, Poonam Dhillon, Prem Chopra, Tom Alter, Avtar Gill and Sujit Kumar. Mithun Chakraborty dancing to the title card was a huge rage those days. In fact, no other movie ever attempted to show their hero dancing in front of the "Title Card".

Plot
Avinash (Mithun) is a dancer and singer in a club. One of his friends captures the terrorist activities of Pratap when Pratap's man are behind him, and he runs away with the film. He is killed in front of Avinash and drops the film in a drum kept on the stage where Avinash was performing. Pratap believes he has handed over the film to him and tortures his brother Sumit and fiancé Sapna killing his mother. Avinash is assaulted and tortured to get the film he manages to escape but gets shot in his head. Dr Anand, a drunkard, saves Avinash's life by removing the bullet from his head. But Avinash loses his memory. Pratap's man are still chasing him to get the film when he is saved by a mysterious women Nisha who tells him that they both loved each other. Nisha actually came into his life to get the film but dies in an explosion telling him her motive. Then Alka, another women, enters his life and claims that he is her husband.

Cast
Mithun Chakraborty ... Avinash "Avi"
Parveen Babi ... Nisha 
Poonam Dhillon ... Dr. Sapna 
Bindiya Goswami ... Alka 
Prem Chopra ... Pratap 
Sujit Kumar ... Inspector Rajan 
Vijay Arora ... Doctor
Sudhir Dalvi ... Dr. Anand
Anil Dhawan ... Deepak
Tom Alter...Tom 
Sulabha Arya ...Avinash's mom 
Ravi Behl ...Sumit 
Bob Christo ...Bob 
Krishan Dhawan ...Police Commissioner Bhagat
Avtar Gill ...C.I.D. Inspector 
T. P. Jain ...Adambhai 
Sujit Kumar...Police Inspector Rajan
Pinchoo Kapoor ... Senior Police Officer 
Imtiaz Khan ...Pratap's Associate 
Viju Khote ... Superfast Jasoos 
Raj Kishore ... Superfast Jasoos 
Yunus Parvez... Superfast Jasoos
Mac Mohan ...Mac 
Kalpana Iyer...Cabaret Dancer at Red Fire Club

Soundtrack
Amit Khanna wrote all the songs. The song "Teri Jo Khushi" is copied from "Beat It" by American singer/songwriter Michael Jackson

External links
 
 https://web.archive.org/web/20110906053638/http://www.bollywoodhungama.com/movies/cast/4876/index.html

1986 films
1980s Hindi-language films
Indian action thriller films
Films scored by Bappi Lahiri
1986 action thriller films